Joseph P. Kennedy is a Distinguished Professor of Polymer Science and Chemistry at the University of Akron, noted particularly for inventing a polymer coating for a drug-tipped stent that is highly compatible to human tissue, and that was successfully commercialized by Boston Scientific.

Personal

Joseph Kenedi spent his youth in Budapest, Hungary during World War II and the beginning of the Cold War. His father was killed by the Nazis, and his mother was imprisoned by communists.  In 1948, he was kicked out of the college where he earned his first degree in chemistry, "for being too bourgeois".

At age 19, he fled to Austria as an illegal immigrant. He gained citizenship upon earning his doctorate in biochemistry from the University of Vienna, and he then completed postgraduate work at the Sorbonne in France.

In 1954, he immigrated to be close to family in Canada, and to take another postdoc position in Montreal.  There he met Ingrid, who later became his wife.

Following many years of success in his field, Kennedy accepted an Honorary Doctorate from Kossuth University in 1989.  He was also elected a member of the Hungarian Academy of Sciences in 1993.

Career

Kennedy's first employment in America was in 1957 with the chemical company Celanese Corp. in Summit, N.J.  He later joined Exxon, where he held a series of positions with increasing responsibility.

His interest in pure science eventually led him to seek a position in academia.  In 1970, he accepted a position with the University of Akron, where he helped to develop the College of Polymer Science and Polymer Engineering.

Awards

 Döbereiner Medaille, F. Schiller Universität, Jena, DDR, 1985
 Honorary Doctorate (Doctor Honoris Causa, D.H.C.), Kossuth University, Debrecen, Hungary, 1989
 Elected External Member of the Hungarian Academy of Sciences, 1993
 George S. Whitby Award for Excellence in Teaching and Research, Rubber Division, Am. Chem. Soc., 1996
 Award for Distinguished Service to Polymer Science, Society of Polymer Science, Japan, 2000
 Charles Goodyear Medal, Rubber Division, American Chemical Society, 2008
 Honorary Doctorate (D.H.C.), The University of Akron, 2008
 Elected Fellow of American Institute of Medical and Biological Engineering (AIMBE), 2010
 Heart Champion Award, American Heart Association, 2011
 Ohio Patent Legacy Award, The Ohio Academy of Science, 2011

References

Living people
Polymer scientists and engineers
University of Akron faculty
Fellows of the American Institute for Medical and Biological Engineering
Year of birth missing (living people)